Jean-Marc Olivier is a French historian born in 1961 in the town of Champagnole (Jura).

Biography and career 
Olivier received the French agrégation in history and is a professor of contemporary history at the University of Toulouse. He was director of the CNRS research group FRAMESPA (Social history from the Middle Ages to today) from 2005-2013. He was elected Vice-President of International Relations at this university in June 2012.

Olivier specializes in small-scale industries (watchmaking, making eyeglasses, hat making) and in different models of economic development. His habilitation compared the French, Scandinavian, and Swiss cases of economic development in the 19th century. He has written a number of books and articles on these subjects, and created the concept of "soft industrialization", a process by which small production units, often in rural areas, played a large role in the industrialization of Continental Europe in the 19th century.

His current research focuses more specifically on the history of aviation and industrialization in France, Switzerland, and Scandinavia over the longue durée.

Publications

Books 
 Des clous, des horloges et des lunettes. Les campagnards moréziens en industrie [Nails, clocks, and glasses. The countryside near Morez and its industry (1780-1914)], Paris, CTHS, 2004, 608 p. [ 
  With Jean-Pierre Amalric and Bernadette Suau (eds.), Toulouse, une métropole méridionale : vingt siècles de vie urbaine [Toulouse, a southern metropolis: twenty centuries of urban life], Toulouse, Méridiennes, 2009, deux volumes, 1100 p.
  Une industrie à la campagne. Le canton de Morez entre 1780 et 1914, [An industry in the countryside: the town of Morez 1780-1914] Salins-les-Bains, musée des techniques et cultures comtoises, 2002, 131 p. Received the Lucien Febvre award for history. 
  With Natalie Petiteau and Sylvie Caucanas (ed.), Les Européens dans les guerres napoléoniennes [Europeans in the Napoleonic wars], Toulouse, Privat, 2012, 260 p.
  (ed.), Histoire de l'armée de l'air et des forces aériennes françaises du XVIIIe siècle à nos jours [History of the French Air Force since the 18th century to the present], Toulouse, Privat, 2014, 552 p.
 With Alain Cortat (eds.), Le profit dans les PME, perspectives historiques, XIXe-XXe siècles, Neuchâtel, Éditions Alphil - Presses universitaires suisses, 2014, 220 p.
 With Rémy Pech (eds.), Histoire de Toulouse et de la métropole, Toulouse, Privat, 2019, 800 p.
 (ed.), Le travail en Europe occidentale des années 1830 aux années 1930, Paris, Armand Colin, 2020, 420 p.

Articles 
 « The Airbus Project Consolidates the Choice of Toulouse as the French Capital of Civil Aeronautics (1917-1970s) », in Nacelles. Past and Present of Aeronautics and Space, n° 11, 2021. https://revues.univ-tlse2.fr/pum/nacelles/index.php?id=1380 [archive]
 https://hal.archives-ouvertes.fr/hal-02612957/document [archive]/ American Heritage, November, 2019, Comparison of Aluminum Alloys from Aircraft of Four Nations Involved in the WWII Conflict Using Multiscale Analyses and Archival Study
 Le Monde, December 31, 2008, La Norvège deuxième actionnaire du CAC 40 !
 Bernadotte, Bonaparte, and Louisiana: The Last Dream of a French Empire in North America 
 La Norvège et la Suisse face à la construction européenne 
 Une frontière transcendée par l'horlogerie : l'Arc jurassien franco-suisse 
 Petites entreprises industrielles et développement économique de l'Europe occidentale

References

External links
 Framespa (UMR 5136)
 IAST 
 Editions Privat
 Editions Alphil
 Profile at Google Scholar

1961 births
20th-century French historians
Living people
Academic staff of the University of Toulouse
People from Champagnole
French male non-fiction writers
21st-century French historians